This is a list of 153 species in Cis, a genus of minute tree-fungus beetles in the family Ciidae.

Cis species

 Cis acritus Lawrence, 1971 i c g
 Cis adamsoni Blair, 1932 g
 Cis alienus Sharp, 1879 i c g
 Cis americanus Mannerheim, 1852 i c g
 Cis angustiformis Perkins, 1900 i c g
 Cis angustus Hatch, 1962 i c g
 Cis arbustensis Zimmerman, 1938 g
 Cis atromaculatus Pic, 1916 g
 Cis aureopubens Pic, 1922 g
 Cis biacutus Reitter, 1908 g
 Cis biarmatus Mannerheim, 1852 i c g
 Cis bicolor Sharp, 1879 i c g
 Cis bidentatus (Olivier, 1790) g
 Cis bilamellatus Wood, 1884 g
 Cis bimaculatus Sharp, 1885 i c g
 Cis bisetosus Blair, 1935 g
 Cis boleti (Scopoli, 1763) i c g
 Cis breviformis Perkins, 1900 i c g
 Cis calidus Sharp, 1885 i c g
 Cis castaneus (Herbst, 1793) g
 Cis castlei (Dury, 1917) i c g
 Cis cayensis Lawrence, 1971 i c g
 Cis cheesmanae Blair, 1927 g
 Cis chinensis Lawrence, 1991 g b
 Cis chloroticus Sharp, 1885 i c g
 Cis chujoi Miyatake, 1982 g
 Cis cognatissimus Perkins, 1900 i c g
 Cis comptus Gyllenhal, 1827 g
 Cis congestus Casey, 1898 i c g
 Cis coriaceus Baudi, 1873 g
 Cis cornelli Lawrence, 1971 i c g
 Cis cornutus Blatchley, 1910 i c g
 Cis creberrimus Mellié, 1848 i c g b
 Cis crinitus Lawrence, 1971 i c g
 Cis cucullatus Wollaston, 1865 g
 Cis dentatus Mellié, 1848 g
 Cis diminutivus Sharp, 1879 i c g
 Cis discolor Lawrence, 1971 i c g
 Cis dracaenae Perkins, 1931 i c g
 Cis dufaui Pic, 1922 g
 Cis dunedinensis Leng, 1918 i c g
 Cis duplex Casey, 1898 i c g
 Cis elongatus (Montrouzier, 1861) g
 Cis ephippiatus Mannerheim, 1853 i c g
 Cis evanescens Sharp, 1879 i c g
 Cis fagi Waltl, 1839 g
 Cis fallax Perkins, 1900 i c g
 Cis festivulus Lawrence, 1971 i c g
 Cis fissicollis Mellié, 1848 g
 Cis fissicornis Mellié, 1848 g
 Cis fiuzai Almeida & Lopes-Andrade g
 Cis floridae Dury, 1917 i c g
 Cis furcicollis Blair, 1935 g
 Cis fusciclavis Nyholm, 1954 g
 Cis fuscipes Mellié, 1848 i c g b  (minute tree-fungus beetle)
 Cis glabratus Mellié, 1848 g
 Cis gladiator Flach, 1882 g
 Cis graecus Schilsky, 1901 g
 Cis gravipennis Perkins, 1931 i c g
 Cis guerini Mellié, 1848 g
 Cis gumiercostai Almeida & Lopes-Andrade g
 Cis haleakalae Perkins, 1900 i c g
 Cis hanseni Strand, 1965 g
 Cis hirsutus Casey, 1898 i c g b
 Cis hispidus (Paykull, 1798) g
 Cis horridulus Casey, 1898 i c g
 Cis huachucae Dury, 1917 i c g
 Cis hystriculus Casey, 1898 i c g
 Cis immaturus Zimmerman, 1939 i c g
 Cis infasciata Pic, 1922 g
 Cis insularis Blackburn & Sharp, 1885 g
 Cis insulicola Dalla Torre, 1911 i c g
 Cis interpunctatus Mellié, 1848 g
 Cis jacquemartii Mellié, 1848 g
 Cis kauaiensis Perkins, 1900 i c g
 Cis krausi Dalla Torre, 1911 i c g
 Cis laeticulus Sharp, 1879 i c g
 Cis laminatus Mellié, 1848 i c g
 Cis lasoni  g
 Cis lemoulti Pic, 1923 g
 Cis levettei (Casey, 1898) i c g b
 Cis lineatocribratus Mellié, 1848 g
 Cis longipennis Sharp, 1885 i c g
 Cis lugowoji  g
 Cis maritimus (Hatch, 1962) i c g
 Cis marquesanus Blair, 1927 g
 Cis megastictus Lawrence, 1971 i c g
 Cis melliei Coquerel, 1849 g
 Cis micans (Fabricius, 1792) g
 Cis miles (Casey, 1898) i c g
 Cis mimus Perkins, 1900 i c g
 Cis minimus (Montrouzier, 1861) g
 Cis mirabilis Perkins, 1900 i c g
 Cis molokaiensis Perkins, 1900 i c g
 Cis montevagus Zimmerman, 1938 g
 Cis multidentatus Pic, 1920 g
 Cis nesiotes Perkins, 1900 i c g
 Cis niedhauki Lawrence, 1971 i c g
 Cis nigrofasciata Pic, 1922 g
 Cis nigrofasciatus Blackburn, 1885 i c g
 Cis nudipennis Perkins, 1931 i c g
 Cis obscuripennis Pic, 1922 g
 Cis olivieri Mellié, 1848 g
 Cis pacificus Sharp, 1879 i c g
 Cis parallelus Scott, 1926 g
 Cis paritii Perkins, 1933 i c g
 Cis pickeri Lopes-Andrade, Matushkina, Buder & Klass, 2009 g
 Cis pistoria Casey, 1898 i c g
 Cis polysticti Chujo, 1939 g
 Cis porcatus Sharp, 1879 i c g
 Cis pumilio Baudi de Selve, 1873 g
 Cis puncticollis Wollaston, 1860 g
 Cis punctifer Mellié, 1848 g
 Cis punctulatus Gyllenhal, 1827 g
 Cis pusillus Gorham, 1898 g
 Cis quadridens Mellié, 1848 g
 Cis quadridentatus (Dury, 1917) i c g b
 Cis quadridentulus Perris, 1874 g
 Cis ragusai Roubal, 1916 g
 Cis rapaae Zimmerman, 1938 g
 Cis regius Orsetti & Lopes-Andrade g
 Cis renominatus  g
 Cis retithorax Scott, 1926 g
 Cis robiniophilus Lawrence, 1971 i c g
 Cis roridus Sharp, 1885 i c g
 Cis rotundulus Lawrence, 1971 i c g b
 Cis rugulosus Mellié, 1848 g
 Cis setarius Sharp, 1885 i c g
 Cis setiger Mellié, 1848 g
 Cis signatus Sharp, 1879 i c g
 Cis simulator Perkins, 1900 i c g
 Cis stereophilus Lawrence, 1971 i c g
 Cis striatulus Mellié, 1848 g
 Cis striolatus Casey, 1898 i c g
 Cis subfuscus Gorham, 1886 i c g b
 Cis submicans Abeille de Perrin g b
 Cis subtilis Mellié, 1848 i c g
 Cis tabidus Sharp, 1879 i c g
 Cis tahitiensis Zimmerman, 1938 g
 Cis taiwanus Chujo, 1939 g
 Cis taurus Reitter, 1878 g
 Cis tetracentrum Gorham, 1886 i c g
 Cis tomentosus Mellié, 1848 g
 Cis tridentatus Mannerheim, 1852 i c g
 Cis tristis Mellié, 1848 i c g
 Cis uapouae Zimmerman, 1938 g
 Cis unicus Perkins, 1900 i c g
 Cis ursulinus Casey, 1898 i c g
 Cis vagans Perkins, 1926 i c g
 Cis versicolor Casey, 1898 i c g b
 Cis villosulus (Marsham, 1802) g
 Cis vitulus Mannerheim, 1843 i c g b
 Cis wollastoni Mellié, 1849 g

Data sources: i = ITIS, c = Catalogue of Life, g = GBIF, b = Bugguide.net

References

Cis